The 1995 Asian Women's Handball Championship, the fifth Asian Championship, which was taking place from 6 to 8 May 1995 in Seoul, South Korea. It acts as the Asian qualifying tournament for the 1995 World Women's Handball Championship.

Standings

Results

Final standing

References
Results

External links
www.asianhandball.com

H
Asian
H
Asian Handball Championships
May 1995 sports events in Asia